Chunhyang may refer to:
Chunhyang, the main character of Chunhyangjeon
 Chunhyang (2000 film), a South Korean film by Im Kwon-taek
 Chunhyang (1968 film), a South Korean film starring Shin Seong-il

See also
 Chunhyangga, one of the five surviving stories of the Korean pansori storytelling tradition